The J Award of 2017 is the thirteenth annual J Awards, established by the Australian Broadcasting Corporation's youth-focused radio station Triple J. The announcement comes at the culmination of Ausmusic Month (November). For the fourth year, four awards were presented; Australian Album of the Year, Double J Artist of the Year, Australian Music Video of the Year and Unearthed Artist of the Year.

The eligible period took place between November 2016 and October 2017. The winners were announced live on air on Triple J on Thursday 23 November 2017.

Awards

Australian Album of the Year

Double J Artist of the Year

Australian Video of the Year

Unearthed Artist of the Year

Perth-based, Stella Donnelly uploaded her debut track "Mechanical Bull" to the Triple J Unearthed site in April 2017. Following this, Donnelly performed with San Cisco, Ali Barter and Polish Club as well as performing on the Unearthed stage at Bigsound.

Donnelly said "It's just been a year of doors opening. I've been really lucky to meet so many amazing people from the music scene. Big shout-out to Alex the Astronaut, Confidence Man, Baker Boy  and Ruby Fields - you're all amazing and been such a strong year. [Let's] just go bowling, hang out!"

References

2017 in Australian music
2017 music awards
J Awards